Jason Widmer (born August 1, 1973) is a Canadian former professional ice hockey defenceman. He played in the National Hockey League with both the New York Islanders and San Jose Sharks.

Career statistics

Regular season and playoffs

External links

1973 births
Living people
Canadian ice hockey defencemen
Capital District Islanders players
Ice hockey people from Calgary
Kentucky Thoroughblades players
Lethbridge Hurricanes players
Moose Jaw Warriors players
New York Islanders draft picks
New York Islanders players
San Jose Sharks players
Worcester IceCats players